Douglas Hulick is an American fantasy writer.

Born in Fargo, North Dakota, he obtained a B.A. in history and English at the University of Illinois, and a master's degree in medieval history at New Mexico State University. He subsequently worked odd jobs and turned to writing fantasy fiction after chancing on a dictionary of historical criminal jargon.

His sword and sorcery novel, Among Thieves, was a finalist for the 2011 Kitschies Golden Tentacle award for best debut novel.

Works
Tales of the Kin series:
Among Thieves, Roc Books, 5 April 2011, 
Sworn in Steel, Roc Books, May 2014,

External links

References

Living people
21st-century American novelists
American fantasy writers
American male novelists
Writers from Fargo, North Dakota
21st-century American male writers
Year of birth missing (living people)